The 2016–17 Santosh Trophy qualifiers are the qualifiers for the 2016–17 Santosh Trophy. All the teams participating in the qualifiers are divided into five zones based on where they are based and each zone is divided into two groups each.

Format
Each team is put into five zones; each zone has two groups. The leaders of every group qualify for the tournament proper.

North Zone

Group A

Group B

South Zone

Group A

Group B

East Zone

Group A

Group B

West Zone

Group A

Group B

NorthEast Zone  santosh trophy team list 2016-17

Group A

Group B

References

External links
 The All India Football Federation website.

2016–17 Santosh Trophy